Jean-Valentin Morel (1794 in Paris-1860) was a French gold and silversmith noted for the quality of his work. He was trained under Adrien-Maximilian, whom was the maker of gold boxes to Louis XVI and Napoleon.

Family 

Jean-Valentin Morel was born in Paris. He was the son of lapidary Valentin Morel, and his mother's family (the Mauzié) were silversmiths.

Morel had a son Prosper whose daughter married Joseph Chaumet, who inherited the family jewelry business in 1885. It now bears his name.

Biography

Early career 

Jean-Valentin Morel learned the lapidary craft from his father and apprenticed with goldsmith Adrien Vachette who worked in the production of gold boxes to Napoleon. In 1818, he launched his own business, and registered his mark on 2 August 1827. Jean-Valentin Morel specialized in high-quality inlay and in the production of hard stone cups in a revival of 16th-century style. At one time, Morel was forced to close his shop because of health problems and lost a year of work.

Between 1834 and 1840, he was chef d'atelier for Jean-Baptiste Fossin, where he worked in embossing on gold and hard stone. In 1842 he signed a contract with silver and goldsmith Henri Duponchel, establishing a craft shop called Morel & Cie on rue Neuve Saint Augustin in Paris which was highly successful and quickly gained an international reputation. The business produced ornamental vases, jewelry sets, table silverware, a missal binding for Pope Gregory XVI, a table service for the King of Sardinia, works for the future William III of the Netherlands, the future Alexander II of Russia, a snuffbox for Henri, Count of Chambord in 1847.... The shop employed 80 employees and won a gold medal at the French Industrial Exposition of 1844.

London 

The economic climate declined and the partnership was dissolved after disagreements. Duponchel filed a lawsuit in 1848 which prevented Morel from working in Paris, and Morel established a partnership with Jules Fossin and moved his business to London in 1850.

In London, Morel was on 7 New Burlington Street - with financial backing from collector Edmond Joly de Bammeville - near the Piccadilly firms of Garrard and Storr & Mortimer, but he found it difficult to establish an English clientele. He gained the support of French exiles from the 1848 Revolution, and was granted a royal warrant by Queen Victoria.

Sèvres, France 

Despite this, he received only modest commissions and by the end of 1852, he was in difficult financial straits. He left London and opened a new workshop in Sèvres, France.

In 1854-1855, he made a lapis lazuli cup for the French patron of the arts Duc de Luynes, an elaborate piece that won the grand medal at the Exposition Universelle (1855).

In 1860, Jean-Valentin Morel died in financial difficulties, after which Duponchel took over exhibition of his work.

Awards 
 1851: Council Medal at Great Exhibition 
1855: Chevalier of the Legion of Honour by Napoleon III

References

Bibliography
 

1794 births
1860 deaths
French silversmiths
French jewellers
French goldsmiths
19th-century French businesspeople